Alpha,alpha-trehalose synthase (trehalose synthase, trehalose synthetase, UDP-glucose:glucose 1-glucosyltransferase, TreT, PhGT) is an enzyme with systematic name ADP-glucose:D-glucose 1-alpha-D-glucosyltransferase. This enzyme catalyses the following chemical reaction

 ADP-glucose + D-glucose  alpha,alpha-trehalose + ADP

This enzyme requires Mg2+ for maximal activity.

References

External links 
 

EC 2.4.1